Dana Hill (born Dana Lynne Goetz; May 6, 1964 – July 15, 1996) was an American actress. She was known for playing Audrey Griswold in National Lampoon's European Vacation, and also known for her roles in Shoot the Moon and Cross Creek. As a voice actress, she was known for her work as Max Goof in Goof Troop. Hill had diabetes that affected physical growth, which meant that she often played children into adolescence and beyond.

Early life and health issues
Dana Lynne Goetz was born on May 6, 1964 in Los Angeles, California, to Theodore Arthur "Ted" Goetz, a director of commercials, and Sandy Hill. A diagnosis of Type I diabetes at an early age ended her athletic career; a 1982 article in People magazine reported that Hill, at age 10, had placed third nationwide in the 880-yard run and fourth in the mile run. A few weeks later, she collapsed on the track, which resulted in her medical diagnosis. The diabetes affected her growth and caused lifelong health complications.

Teen years
Despite her father's strong discouragement, Hill's initial work was in commercials (her first job was a 1973 commercial for the YMCA, spinning a basketball on her finger with Boston Celtics center Dave Cowens). To avoid the appearance of nepotism, she used her mother's maiden name and devoted herself to acting as a career. She appeared in guest roles on such programs as Family before landing a major role on the 1981–1982 CBS series The Two of Us as Gabrielle "Gabby" Gallagher. While filming this series, the 17-year-old Hill would sometimes be pulled over by the police while driving to the studio because she looked too young to drive. 

Her breakthrough role was in the 1981 television film Fallen Angel. The 17-year-old Hill played 12-year-old molestation victim Jennifer Phillips, a role that earned her a Young Artist Award for Best Young Actress in a Television Special.

From 1981 to 1982, Hill played the regular role of Gabby Gallagher in the sitcom The Two of Us. In 1982, Hill played Sherry Dunlap in Shoot the Moon. The same year, she played Frankie Addams, the lead character in the made-for-TV adaptation of The Member of the Wedding, co-starring with Pearl Bailey. She starred with Rip Torn and Mary Steenburgen in the 1983 film Cross Creek, a semi-biographical story about Marjorie Kinnan Rawlings, author of The Yearling.

In 1982 and 1983, Hill made two guest appearances in the TV series The Fall Guy. In season 1, episode 18 "Child's Play", she played a young girl called Libby. In season 2, episode 20 "P.S. I Love You" she had the role of 21-year-old stuntwoman Cassie Farraday. In 1983, she made a guest appearance on Magnum, P.I. in the episode "Basket Case". She played Willie, a 13-year-old foster child who joined Magnum's youth basketball team.

At age 19, she starred in a 1984 CBS Schoolbreak Special titled Welcome Home, Jellybean, playing Geraldine "Jellybean" Oxley, a 12-year-old developmentally disabled girl whose parents take her out of an institution so she can experience a normal home life. The same year, she appeared in Shelley Duvall's 1980s children's TV series Faerie Tale Theatre, playing the princess in an episode titled "The Boy Who Left Home to Find Out About the Shivers".

In 1986, she had another role in the TV series The Fall Guy. She appeared in the episode "Tag Team".

Hill also was a celebrity guest on the game shows Hot Potato (hosted by Bill Cullen),  Body Language (hosted by Tom Kennedy) and on the 1990 version of To Tell the Truth.

Film roles
The producers of the 1983 movie National Lampoon's Vacation were planning a sequel, but Anthony Michael Hall declined to reprise his role as son Rusty Griswold, choosing instead to do the film Weird Science. The producers decided to recast the roles of both Griswold children, and so for National Lampoon's European Vacation, Hill was chosen to replace Dana Barron, the original actress who portrayed Audrey.

Alongside George Clooney, Hill appeared as Cadet Sergeant Andrea Pritchett in Combat Academy (also known as Combat High), a 1986 film from the producers of Police Academy.

Voice acting
Beginning in 1987, she provided the voice for Scrappy, the orphan mouse, on eight episodes of Mighty Mouse: The New Adventures. She also provided the voice of Toots in the episode "The Bright Eyes Mob" for Pound Puppies. She was Teddy-2 in Jetsons: The Movie (1990); from 1989–1991 she voiced Buddy on the animated children's television show Disney's Adventures of the Gummi Bears, in 1991 was the voice of Tank Muddlefoot on Darkwing Duck and in 1992–1993 was the voice of Max on Goof Troop. She was also the speaking voice of Tim (Tom's proclaimed twin brother) in Tom and Jerry Kids. Her voice was featured as Jerry Mouse in Tom and Jerry: The Movie, Norton in the DIC cartoon What-a-Mess, Charles Duckman in Duckman until her death in 1996. She was also a semi-regular panelist on the 1990s version of To Tell the Truth.

Death
Hill slipped into a diabetic coma in May 1996 and suffered a massive paralytic stroke the following month. On July 15, 1996, Hill died at age 32. Her body was cremated following her death.

Filmography

Film

Television

References

External links
 

1964 births
1996 deaths
Actresses from Los Angeles
American child actresses
American film actresses
American television actresses
American voice actresses
Deaths from diabetes
People with type 1 diabetes
20th-century American actresses